The 1975 Cairo Open was a men's tennis tournament played on outdoor clay courts that was independent, i.e. not part of the Grand Prix or WCT circuit. It was the inaugural edition of the tournament and played at Cairo in Egypt. The event was held from 3 March through 9 March 1975 and Manuel Orantes won the singles title.

Finals

Singles
 Manuel Orantes defeated  Francois Jauffret 6–0, 4–6, 6–1, 6–3

Doubles
 Manuel Orantes /  Antonio Muñoz defeated  Jaime Pinto-Bravo /  Belus Prajoux 3–6, 6–3, 6–4, 7–5

References

External links
 ITF tournament edition details

Cairo Open
Cairo Open
1975 in Egyptian sport